St Mary's Church (or The Parish Church of Saint Mary the Virgin) is an Anglican church and Grade I Listed building in Barton-upon-Humber, North Lincolnshire, England.

Architecture
The earliest building on the site dates to the 11th Century, of which only the lower part of the tower and the north aisle arcade survive. The majority of the building is in the Early English style. The windows date to the 14th and 15th centuries with the window glass assembled in the 17th century. It included chancel monuments dating to 1626 and 1729. The porch was restored in 1938.

Gallery

References

External links

Website of The Parish Church of Saint Mary the Virgin

11th-century church buildings in England
Church of England church buildings in Lincolnshire
Grade I listed churches in Lincolnshire
Borough of North Lincolnshire
St Mary's Church